Tommy Sinclair may refer to:
 Tommy Sinclair (footballer, born 1921) (1921–2015), English footballer
 Tommy Sinclair (footballer, born 1897) (1897–1967), English footballer
 Tommy Sinclair (Scottish footballer) (fl. 1938–1939)

See also
 Thomas Sinclair (disambiguation)